Lafir is a name belongs to Sri Lankan Moors which is commonly used as a surname in Sri Lanka. It may refer to

Surname 
A. C. M. Lafir (born 1935), Sri Lankan cricketer
A. F. Lafir (died 1996), Sri Lankan military personnel 
Muhammad Lafir (1930 – 1981), Sri Lankan billiards player